BS4 or BS-4 may refer to :
 BS4, a BS postcode area for Bristol, England
 BS-4, Biuro Szyfrów 4, the German section of the Polish Cipher Bureau 
 BS4, a center drill bit size
 B-s4, a variant of the Antonov A-1 aircraft
 BS 4 Specification for Structural Steel Sections, a British Standard
 Bonomi BS.4 Basettino, an Italian primary glider in the 1930s
 Brilliance BS4, a 2007 Chinese car
 BS-IV Bharat Stage emission standards in India
 BS4, a brass left-hand threaded Gas cylinder valve
 Beautiful Soup, imported as bs4, an HTML and XML parser written in the Python programming language